Tamerlan Anzorovich Tsarnaev (October 21, 1986 – April 19, 2013) was an American-based Chechen terrorist and former boxer of Chechen and Avar descent  who, with his brother Dzhokhar Tsarnaev, planted pressure cooker bombs at the Boston Marathon on April 15, 2013. The bombings killed three people and reportedly injured as many as 281 others. He emigrated to the United States in 2004 at the age of 18. At the time of the bombings, Tsarnaev was an aspiring boxer.

Shortly after the Federal Bureau of Investigation declared them suspects in the bombings and released images of them, the Tsarnaev brothers killed an MIT policeman, carjacked an SUV, and engaged in a shootout with the police in the Boston suburb of Watertown. According to the federal indictment, during the shootout, Tamerlan was captured but died, partly as a result of his brother driving over him, and an MBTA police officer was critically injured in the course of Dzhokhar's escape in the SUV, the latter by what may have been friendly fire. An injured Dzhokhar escaped, but was found, arrested, and hospitalized on the evening of April 19 after an unprecedented manhunt in which thousands of police officials searched a 20-block area of Watertown.

During his incarceration, Tsarnaev's brother allegedly said during questioning that the pair next intended to detonate explosives in Times Square in New York City. Dzhokhar reportedly told authorities that he and his brother were radicalized, at least in part, by watching lectures by Anwar al-Awlaki.

Personal background

Family background

The Tsarnaev family was forcibly moved from Chechnya to the Soviet republic of Kyrgyzstan in the years following World War II. Anzor Tsarnaev is a Chechen, and Zubeidat Tsarnaeva is an Avar. The couple had two sons, with Tamerlan Tsarnaev born in the Kalmyk Autonomous Soviet Socialist Republic on October 21, 1986, and Dzhokhar Tsarnaev born in Kyrgyzstan on July 22, 1993. The parents also have two daughters. According to some, other Chechen Americans in the area apparently did not consider the American branch of the family to be fully Chechen because they had never lived in Chechnya.

As children, Tsarnaev and his brother lived in Tokmok, Kyrgyzstan. In 2001, the family moved to Makhachkala, Dagestan, in the Russian Federation. In April 2002, the Tsarnaev parents and Dzhokhar went to the United States on a 90-day tourist visa. Anzor Tsarnaev applied for asylum, citing fears of deadly persecution due to his ties to Chechnya.

Tsarnaev was left in the care of his uncle Ruslan in Kyrgyzstan, and arrived in the U.S. around two years later. In the U.S. the parents received asylum and then filed for their four children, who received "derivative asylum status". They settled on Norfolk Street in Cambridge, Massachusetts. Tsarnaev lived in Cambridge on 410 Norfolk Street until his death.

The family "was in constant transition" for the next decade. Anzor and Zubeidat Tsarnaev both received welfare benefits. The father worked as a backyard mechanic and the mother worked as a cosmetologist until she lost her job for refusing to work in a business that served men. In March 2007, the family was granted legal permanent residence.

Early life
Tamerlan Tsarnaev was born in the Kalmyk Autonomous Soviet Socialist Republic (now Kalmykia), a North Caucasus unit of the Soviet Union, the RSFSR. He was a permanent resident of the U.S., a Russian citizen, and a Kyrgyzstani citizen.

Activities prior to the bombings

2003–2007
According to his immigration file, Tsarnaev was admitted to the U.S. in 2003, receiving his visa at the U.S. consulate in Ankara, Turkey. After arriving in the U.S., he attended Cambridge Rindge and Latin School, a public high school. He applied for admission at the University of Massachusetts Boston for the fall of 2006, but was rejected. He attended Bunker Hill Community College part-time for three terms between 2006 and 2008, studying accounting with hopes of becoming an engineer. He dropped out of school to concentrate on boxing.

In 2007, Tsarnaev confronted a Brazilian youth who had dated his younger sister, Bella, for about two years, and punched him in the face. A high school friend of Bella said Tsarnaev did not approve because the boy was not a Muslim.

2008
During 2008, Tsarnaev became a devout Muslim and stopped drinking and smoking (eventually becoming an extremist a year later). He began to regularly attend the Islamic Society of Boston mosque near his home in Cambridge.  Although the Americans for Peace and Tolerance, a longtime critic of the mosque, alleges to support "a brand of Islamic thought that encourages grievances against the West, distrust of law enforcement and opposition to Western forms of government, dress and social values," the mosque has condemned terrorism and would even later ask Tsarnaev to stop attending due to him interrupting the Friday sermon.

In May 2008, his sister said her husband was cheating on her and beating her up. Tsarnaev flew across the country to Bellingham, Washington, to "straighten up the brains" of his brother-in-law, Khozhugov.

2009
An aspiring heavyweight boxer, Tsarnaev trained at the Wai Kru Mixed Martial Arts Center, a Boston club. In 2009–10, he was the New England Golden Gloves heavyweight champion, winning the Rocky Marciano Trophy. In May 2009, he fought in the nationals in the 201-pound weight class, but lost a first-round decision.

Tsarnaev first dated Nadine Ascencao who became his live-in girlfriend. After an incident between Ascencao and Tsarnaev, she called 911 crying hysterically and asking for help. Tsarnaev was arrested at his home at 410 Norfolk Street in Cambridge, on July 28, 2009, for aggravated domestic assault and battery. The case was dismissed for lack of prosecution, but Tsarnaev's father attributed to it the delay in his eldest son gaining U.S. citizenship.

Tsarnaev then began dating an American, Katherine Russell, from North Kingstown, Rhode Island, on and off while she attended Suffolk University from 2007 to 2010. She converted to Islam and started wearing a hijab in 2008. Friends said he would shout at her that she was a "slut". They described fights in which he would "fly into rages and sometimes throw furniture or throw things".

The Tsarnaev brothers' uncle, Ruslan Tsarni, said he "had been concerned about his nephew being an extremist since 2009". Tsarni said that Tsarnaev's radicalization started not during his visit to Russia in January 2012, but much earlier in Boston after he was influenced by a Muslim convert known as "Misha". "Misha" was later identified as Mikhail Allakhverdov, a 39-year-old from Rhode Island (of Armenian-Ukrainian origin, born in Azerbaijan). Allakhverdov told The New York Review of Books that he rejected violence, was not Tsarnaev's teacher, had not spoken to Tamerlan in three years and had never met his family members. Furthermore, he said that he had cooperated with a brief FBI investigation that the NYRB reported had found no ties between Allakhverdov and the attacks.

2010
According to a 2010 photo essay about him in The Comment, the graduate student magazine of Boston University College of Communication, Tsarnaev said that he was working to become a naturalized citizen in time to be selected for the U.S. Olympic boxing team. He added that he would "rather compete for the United States than for Russia", while remarking that he "didn't understand" Americans and did not have any American friends. A later FBI report recorded Tamerlan stating that was a misquote, and that most of his friends were American. He added that he abstained from drinking and smoking, because "God says no to alcohol" and that "there are no values anymore. People can't control themselves".

Pro-super middleweight Edwin Rodriguez sparred with Tsarnaev in 2010, and later said that, although Tsarnaev hit hard, he lacked competitiveness and immediately complained of stomach pain and rib pain. He described Tsarnaev as arrogant but "a coward". Tsarnaev's landlord said the boxer's aspirations were never met because "his back was in really bad shape and he couldn't get into the Olympics".
His coach and another boxer described him as talented but cool and arrogant. Rule changes disqualified all non-US citizens from Golden Gloves boxing, ending Tsarnaev's boxing career and Olympic hopes.

According to an aunt in Dagestan, "He started to be really interested in Islam about three years ago [April 2010], but he was never a radical."

In the spring of 2010, his girlfriend Katherine Russell became pregnant with their child and dropped out of college at the end of her junior year to marry Tsarnaev on June 21, 2010, in a 15-minute ceremony in an office at the Masjid Al Quran in the Dorchester area of Greater Boston. Imam Taalib Mahdee said that he had not met the couple before the ceremony, and Katherine was the one who had called and asked to be married there. Katherine Russell had converted to Islam after starting dating Tsarnaev and had adopted the Muslim name Karima. The couple had a daughter, Zahara Tsarnaev, born in October 2010.

Tsarnaev first came to the attention of Russian security forces in December 2010 when William Plotnikov was briefly detained in Dagestan and forced to disclose his social networking contacts in North America with ties to Russia.

2011
In early 2011, Russia's Federal Security Service (FSB) told the Federal Bureau of Investigation that Tsarnaev was a follower of Islamic extremism and a strong believer. The FSB said that he was preparing to leave the United States to travel to the Russian region to join unspecified underground groups. The FBI initially denied that it had contacted Tsarnaev, but then said that it actually had after Tsarnaev's mother talked about the FBI's contacts with her son on RT. The FBI said that it interviewed him and relatives of his, but did not find any terrorist activity, and that it provided the results in the summer of 2011. At that point, the FBI asked the FSB for more information, but the Russians did not respond to the American request, and the FBI officially closed the case.

Tsarnaev's mother said that FBI agents had told her they feared her son was an "extremist leader", and that he was getting information from "extremist sites". She said Tsarnaev had been under FBI surveillance for at least three years and that "they were controlling every step of him". The FBI flatly denied this accusation. Tsarnaev "vaguely discussed" jihad during a 2011 phone call with his mother that was taped by the FSB, and intelligence officials also discovered text messages in which his mother discussed how he was ready to die for Islam. In late 2011, the Central Intelligence Agency put both Tsarnaev and his mother on its Terrorist Identities Datamart Environment database.

Involvement in Waltham triple murder

Two Jewish men, Erik Weissman and Raphael Teken, as well as their roommate Brendan Mess, were killed in a triple homicide in Waltham, Massachusetts, on September 11, 2011, the 10-year anniversary of the 9/11 attacks. Each victim's throat had been slit with such great force as to be nearly decapitated. Thousands of dollars worth of marijuana and cash were left covering the victims' bodies, and $5,000 was left at the scene. The local district attorney said that it appeared that the killer and the victims knew each other. It was reported on April 23, 2013, that local authorities believed Tsarnaev may have been responsible for the triple homicide, and they and the FBI were investigating the possibility. In May, forensic evidence connected the two brothers to the scene of the killings, and their cell phone records appeared to place them in the area. The officials cautioned that until more definitive DNA testing is complete, it is still too early to consider bringing an indictment against the younger of the two brothers.

ABC reported on April 23, 2013, that authorities linked Tsarnaev to the Waltham unsolved triple homicide. A search warrant affidavit partially unsealed in November 2019 provided further details to Tsarnaev's link to the triple homicide.

Visit to Russia and return to the United States

Visit to Russia
Tsarnaev traveled to Russia through Moscow's Domodedovo International Airport in January 2012, and returned to the U.S. in July 2012. He and his wife received public assistance and food stamps from September 2011 to November 2012, which included all the time Tsarnaev was in Russia. Zubeidat Tsarnaeva said her son had wanted his wife and their child to move to Dagestan with him, and that: "She herself agreed; she said she wanted to study a different culture, language."

During the six months he was overseas, he visited his family in the North Caucasus.

Tsarnaev's father said that he was with him in Makhachkala, the capital of Dagestan, for six months and that they had done ordinary things, such as visiting relatives. His father also said that they visited Chechnya twice, to see relatives there and to receive his son's new Russian passport. While Tsarnaev arrived in Russia in January 2012, however, he only arrived in Dagestan around March, and his father arrived there in May. U.S. House Homeland Security Chairman Michael McCaul said he believed that Tsarnaev received training during his trip, and became radicalized. In an early report, Dagestan's interior minister Abdurashid Magomedov said through a spokesman that Tsarnaev "did not have contact with the [Islamist] underground during his visit".

The Tsarnaev brothers' mother's second cousin, Magomed Kartashov, is a figure in Dagestan's Islamist community. Zubeidat confirmed that they "became very close." Kartashov's Islamist organization, "The Union of the Just," advocates Islam as a political system under sharia law. Kartashov later stated the Boston bombing was "good" in that it would increase converts to Islam, similar to the attacks of September 11.

According to media reports, Tsarnaev was seen by Dagestan police, who were conducting surveillance, making six visits to a known Islamic militant in a Salafi mosque in Makhachkala founded by an associate of Ayman Zawahiri. According to Russian investigative newspaper Novaya Gazeta, quoting unnamed Russian security sources, Tsarnaev was linked to 23-year-old William Plotnikov, an ethnic Russian-Tatar Islamic militant and Canadian citizen, with whom he communicated via online social networking sites. Tsarnaev had also visited Toronto, where Plotnikov lived with his parents. Once in Dagestan, Tsarnaev is said to have met on several occasions with Makhmud Mansur Nidal, a 19-year-old Dagestani-Palestinian man. Nidal was under close surveillance by Dagestan's anti-extremism unit for six months as a suspected recruiter for Islamist insurgents, before the police killed him in May. According to Novaya Gazeta, Tsarnaev had sought to join the local insurgency, and was put on a period of 'quarantine' – a clearance check by insurgents looking for infiltrating double agents, taking several months for a recruit to be verified. After Tsarnaev's alleged contacts were both killed, he "got frightened and fled". He left Russia in July two days after Plotnikov was killed, in an apparent hurry that Russian authorities considered suspicious, not waiting to pick up his new Russian passport – ostensibly one of his main reasons for coming to Russia.

In an interview, Tsarnaev's father later said he had to force his son to return to the United States to complete his U.S. citizenship application, after Tsarnaev tried to convince his family to allow him to stay in Dagestan for good.

Return to U.S.
Tsarnaev returned to the U.S. on July 17, 2012, having grown a long, thick beard and wearing kohl around his eyes as a sign of his religious devotion to the Sunni of Islam and the example of Muhammad. His life took on an "increasingly puritanical religious tone" with "Islamist certainty". He appeared, to some family members, to have become an "extremist".

After his return to the U.S., Tsarnaev created a YouTube channel with playlist links to two videos which were tagged under a category labeled "Terrorists", including one to Dagestani Islamic militant Amir Abu Dujana (Gadzhimurad Dolgatov, also known as 'Robin Hood', a commander of a small group in the Kizilyurt district, who was killed in battle in late December 2012); the videos were later deleted. CNN and the SITE Institute found a screen grab of one of the videos, which featured members of the militant Islamist group Caucasus Emirate from the North Caucasus. He also linked to jihadi videos on YouTube, including ones by radical cleric Feiz Mohammad; in one video, voices can be heard singing in Arabic as bombs explode. He frequently read extremist sites, including Al-Qaeda in the Arabian Peninsula's Inspire online magazine.

Tsarnaev applied for U.S. citizenship on September 5, 2012, but Homeland Security held up the application for "additional review" because they found a record of the 2011 FBI interview of him.

Tsarnaev and his wife were receiving state welfare benefits as late as November 2012, but not at the time of the Marathon Bombings in April 2013. His wife's lawyer said that Tsarnaev was unemployed prior to the bombing and had been helping take care of their daughter, while his wife worked over 70 hours a week as a home health care aide, to support her family.

Tsarnaev was pulled over by police in Boston, Brookline, and Cambridge at least nine times in four years. The source does not state which years these were exactly.

In November 2012, Tsarnaev reportedly confronted a shopkeeper at a Middle Eastern grocery store in Cambridge, near a mosque where he sometimes prayed, after seeing a sign there advertising Thanksgiving turkeys. He said "This is kuffar"—an Arabic reference to non-Muslims—"that's not right!". Also in November 2012, Tsarnaev stood up and challenged a sermon in which the speaker said that, just like "we all celebrate the birthday of the Prophet, we can also celebrate July 4 and Thanksgiving," according to Yusufi Vali, a mosque spokesman. Vali said Tsarnaev stated he "took offense to celebrating anything," be it the Prophet's birthday (which not all Muslims celebrate) or American holidays. In January 2013, Tsarnaev again disrupted a Martin Luther King Jr. Day sermon at a mosque in Cambridge. He objected to the speaker's comparison of Muhammad to Martin Luther King Jr. Tsarnaev was shouted down by members of the congregation and was later asked not to return to the mosque unless he was willing to refrain from shouting during sermons. The mosque said Tsarnaev had disrupted a sermon previously.

2013 Boston Marathon bombing, MIT killing, and carjacking

Tamerlan Tsarnaev, along with his brother Dzhokhar, committed the Boston Marathon bombing on April 15, 2013. After the bombing, both were involved in the murder of MIT police officer Sean Collier. In the process of escaping, the brothers committed a carjacking on April 18, 2013. Dun "Danny" Meng, the carjacking victim, was held hostage in his car until his escape at a gas station. A subsequent shootout in Watertown between the brothers and police would result in Tamerlan's death.

Death

In the early hours of April 19, 2013, in Watertown, a suburb of Boston, Tsarnaev was apprehended by police after being shot multiple times. The exact sequence of events remains clouded in confusion, as do key details.

According to paramedic Michael Sullivan, who treated him after the shootout, Tsarnaev angrily resisted efforts by paramedics to treat him as he was being driven to the hospital, lifting himself from the stretcher and screaming loudly. 

He was taken to Beth Israel Deaconess Medical Center, where, despite efforts to revive him by emergency medical personnel, he was pronounced dead from several critical injuries, massive blood loss, and cardiac and respiratory arrest. Emergency physicians said that he did not appear to have been run over. An eyewitness says that he was struck by a police SUV before he was shot multiple times.

Tsarnaev's parents continue to proclaim his innocence. His mother is quoted as saying, "America took my kids away from me. I'm sure my kids were not involved in anything."

The imam of a prominent Boston mosque condemned the violence and distanced himself and his mosque from the suspects, refusing to give Tsarnaev a Muslim burial. His body was released to the funeral service hired by the family at 5:30 pm. EDT May 2, 2013, by the Massachusetts Office of the Chief Medical Examiner. 

His death certificate gives cause of death as gunshot wounds to the torso and extremities, as well as blunt trauma to the head and torso. It is confirmed that he was struck and dragged by a vehicle, in addition to being shot.

Tsarnaev's body was moved to a funeral home in North Attleborough; after protesters picketed the building, it was handed over to Graham, Putnam, and Mahoney Funeral Parlor in Worcester. Officials in Boston, Cambridge, at a state prison, and in over 120 other U.S. and Canadian locations refused to allow Tsarnaev's body to be buried in their jurisdictions. 

On May 9, Worcester police announced that Tsarnaev's body had been buried in an undisclosed location. It was later reported that Tsarnaev was buried in a small Muslim cemetery, Al-Barzakh Cemetery, in Doswell, Virginia. The burial was set in motion by Martha Mullen of Richmond, Virginia, who said she was appalled by the protests at the funeral home, which she said "portrayed America at its worst" and wanted to find a way to end the impasse. She contacted Islamic Funeral Services of Virginia, which agreed to provide an unmarked plot in their cemetery. The funeral agency released a statement saying "What Tsarnaev did is between him and God. We strongly disagree with his violent actions, but that does not release us from our obligation to return his body to the earth." Caroline County Sheriff Tony Lippa said the burial was legal. Locals, as well as the imam of the Virginia Islamic Centre, condemned the secretive burial.

On June 19, 2013, Tsarnaev's name was read aloud (in the context of a victim of gun violence) during a "No More Names" event held in Concord, New Hampshire. In response, Michael Bloomberg's Mayors Against Illegal Guns issued a statement explaining that they were using a list compiled by Slate, and apologized saying that his name was "a mistake" and should have been removed.

Family members

Dzhokhar Tsarnaev

Ruslan Tsarni
Ruslan Tsarni is the paternal uncle of Tamerlan Tsarnaev, and the brother of Anzor Tsarnaev. He was trained as a lawyer, and moved to Washington State in 1995. He returned to Kyrgyzstan by the end of the decade, and then returned to the United States, settling in Montgomery County, Maryland.

During the manhunt for the brothers, he was interviewed by the FBI. When the media arrived at his home, he denounced the actions of his nephews and called on them to turn themselves in. He also buried the remains of Tsarnaev.

Zubeidat Tsarnaeva
Zubeidat Tsarnaeva is the mother of Tsarnaev and his brother. In photos of her as a younger woman, she wore western-style clothing. After she arrived in the U.S. from Russia in 2002, she took classes at the Catherine Hinds Institute of Esthetics before becoming a state-licensed aesthetician and getting a job at a suburban day spa. After deciding she could no longer work in a business that served men, she started working from home, where clients saw her become more radical and promote 9/11 conspiracy theories.

Tsarnaev's mother has been quoted as saying she urged him to embrace Islam in 2008 because she was concerned about his drinking, smoking, and pursuit of women. She said he began to read more about it on the Internet. She also urged him to quit boxing because Islam prohibits hitting someone in the face. She also praised Russell, saying, "She is a serious, good, American girl who converted to Islam as if she had always been a Muslim. We all love her a lot."

Tsarnaev's mother discussed jihad during a 2011 phone call with him that was taped by a Russian government agency, and intelligence officials also discovered text messages in which she discussed how Tsarnaev was ready to die for Islam. His mother was also recorded suggesting that Tsarnaev go to Palestine.

Both Tsarnaev and his mother were the subject of a Russian Intelligence inquiry to the U.S. government in 2011 because of what the Russians perceived as extremist Islamic views. She was interviewed by the FBI who found nothing to pursue at the time. In late 2011, the CIA put both Tsarnaev and his mother in its Terrorist Identities Datamart Environment database.

Ruslan Tsarni told the AP from his home in Maryland that he believed his former sister-in-law had a "big-time influence" on Tsarnaev's growing embrace of his Muslim faith and decision to quit boxing and school.

In early 2012, Zubeidat Tsarnaeva was arrested for shoplifting $1,624 worth of women's clothing from Lord and Taylor in Natick, Massachusetts. She left the U.S. for Russia and did not appear in court. Anzor and Zubeidat Tsarnaev divorced in 2011 after twenty-five years of marriage. The couple had no personal property or real estate to divide and listed no retirement or pension benefits. They gave the reason for their split as "irretrievable breakdown of the marriage" with "no chance of reconciling our differences". The mother's move toward more Islamic extremism was reportedly a factor in the breakdown of the marriage. They may have reconciled in Dagestan.

She has strongly expressed in TV interviews that her sons are innocent and that they were framed by the FBI.

Katherine Russell
Tamerlan Tsarnaev's widow, Katherine Russell (a.k.a. Karima Tsarnaeva or Katherine Tsarnaeva), was born on February 6, 1989, in Texas. She was raised in Rhode Island; her father is an emergency room doctor and her mother is a nurse. Their home has been described as nominally Christian and Russell reportedly was not religious "at all" in high school. She attended North Kingstown High School, and graduated in 2007. Her yearbook entry lists her plans as college and the Peace Corps. She was remembered for her talent in painting and drawing.

Tsarnaev and Russell met in 2007 in a nightclub, soon after she started as a communications major at Suffolk University. They started dating on and off, and at one point in 2009, Tsarnaev was living with another woman. Tamerlan was known to cheat on Russell, and a friend of Russell's told her mother that the relationship was abusive. Russell's mother did not like Tamerlan from the first time she met him. At Tsarnaev's insistence, Russell converted to Islam in 2008, adopted the hijab, and chose the name Karima after her conversion.

Russell dropped out of college in the Spring of 2010 after she became pregnant in her junior year, and the couple married on June 21, 2010, in a 15-minute ceremony in a Dorchester mosque. According to the officiant, it was Russell who called and made the arrangements. Only two witnesses attended the wedding.

She moved into her husband's apartment in Cambridge and gave birth to their daughter Zahara in late 2010. At times, she worked as a home health aide. From September 2011 to November 2012, she and her husband had their income supplemented by public assistance and food stamps. When Tsarnaev was in Russia for six months, she and their daughter stayed in Cambridge.

At the time of the bombings on April 15, 2013, Russell was living with her husband and daughter in the Norfolk Street family home in Cambridge. The younger brother also officially lived there, but in practice stayed in a dorm at UMass Dartmouth.

After her husband died, Russell retreated to her parents' home in Rhode Island. Her parents released a statement saying "[o]ur daughter has lost her husband today, the father of her child. We cannot begin to comprehend how this horrible tragedy occurred. In the aftermath of the Patriots' Day horror, we know that we never really knew Tamerlan Tsarnaev. Our hearts are sickened by the knowledge of the horror he has inflicted." She refused to take custody of her husband's remains and has reverted to using her maiden name.

Investigators found bomb-making instructions, downloaded from Inspire magazine, on Russell's computer. Dzhokhar Tsarnaev told the FBI that he and his brother had learned to make bombs by reading Inspire, but it was not clear who downloaded the files. Her web history included searches for "If your husband becomes a shahid, what are the rewards for you?" and "the rewards for the wife of Mujahedeen." The FBI collected Russell's DNA after female DNA was found on bomb fragments; neither her DNA nor her fingerprints matched those on the bombs.

No charges have been filed against Russell and "there’s been no suggestion at all by the government that she’s going to be indicted," according to her lawyer, Amato DeLuca. He insists that Russell was not aware of her husband's criminal activity, and says she has since "provided them [the FBI] with a lot of information, many, many, many many hours. I don’t know what else she could have done."

, she lived on "a quiet street in New Jersey" with her daughter.

Biographical portrayals

References

Footnotes

Notes

Further reading
 Tsarnaev Family (Wall Street Journal)

Avar people
Chechen people
People from Elista
Russian emigrants to the United States
Russian emigrants to Kyrgyzstan
Russian Islamists
Russian spree killers
Boston Marathon bombing
Chechen Islamists
Islamist bombers
People shot dead by law enforcement officers in the United States
Kyrgyzstani emigrants to the United States
Kyrgyzstani Muslims
Kyrgyzstani expatriates in the United States
Naturalized citizens of Kyrgyzstan
1986 births
2013 deaths
Bunker Hill Community College alumni
Deaths by firearm in Massachusetts
People from Cambridge, Massachusetts
Russian expatriates in the United States
Russian expatriates in Kyrgyzstan
Russian male boxers
Russian Muslims
Russian people of Chechen descent
Russian people of Dagestani descent
Cambridge Rindge and Latin School alumni
Sportspeople from Kalmykia